Brockton Airport was an airfield operational in the mid-20th century in Brockton, Massachusetts.

References

Defunct airports in Massachusetts
Airports in Plymouth County, Massachusetts
Buildings and structures in Brockton, Massachusetts